Kamba County (Chinese: 岗巴县; Pinyin: Gǎngbā Xiàn) is a county of Xigazê in  the Tibet Autonomous Region, bordering India's Sikkim state to the south. The capital lies at Kampa Dzong town which has a noted military facility.

Town and townships
 Kampa Dzong
 Lungrong Township
 Gurme Township
 Chig Township
 Changlung Township

Counties of Tibet
Shigatse